The Nord 2200 was a French carrier-based, jet-engined interceptor developed in the late 1940s. It was intended to compete for an Aéronavale (French Naval Aviation) contract, but was not selected for production after a 1950 accident badly damaged the sole prototype. It was repaired and resumed flight testing the following year, which including evaluating rocket-assisted take offs. After the aircraft made its last flight in 1954, it was used as a gunnery target. Much of the airframe was recovered in the 1980s, but its current disposition is uncertain.

Development and description
All of its aircraft were piston-engined and had been rendered obsolete by the advent of jet-propelled aircraft during the war. The French lacked an indigenous turbojet design and licensed the British Rolls-Royce Nene to facilitate their development of jet-propelled aircraft. Aéronavale issued a requirement for a jet-powered interceptor on 29 March 1946 and then issued a request for proposals on 8 June. The SNCAC NC 1080 and Arsenal VG 90 were the other competitors for the contract for 90 aircraft.

The single-seat Nord Aviation 2200 had a low-mounted two-spar wing that was swept back at an angle of 24°. It was fitted with tricycle landing gear and provision was made for an arrestor hook. Dive brakes were fitted on the lower surfaces of the non-folding wings and it was equipped with an all-moving horizontal stabilizer. Air for the license-built  Nene 102 engine was provided by an oval intake in the nose. The entire aft fuselage could be removed to allow access to the engine. The cockpit was armored and the pilot was provided with an ejection seat.

The prototype was unarmed, but Nord intended production aircraft to be armed with the required three 30 mm autocannon, albeit with 150 rounds per gun rather than the full 200 even though the location for the guns had not yet been decided. Nord also investigated changing the armament to four  autocannon.

Construction and flight testing
Design work on the 2200 began in early 1946 and the company submitted its proposal on 16 October. A contract for one prototype followed on 27 December. It was completed behind schedule and did not begin taxiing trials until 10 November 1949. Its maiden flight followed on 16 December and flight testing was generally satisfactory. The aircraft was flown to Brétigny-sur-Orge Air Base on 3 April 1950 to begin its official trials at the Air Force's Centre d'essais en vol (Flight-testing Center). The test pilots evaluated the Nord 2200 as having very good flying and handling qualities, although it was underpowered and was only able to reach  and Mach 0.83. Its dive brakes proved to be completely ineffective and it did have some bad stall characteristics at certain weights.

The prototype was displayed at the Paris Air Show on 11 June and caught on fire during take off on the 24th after the cap for one of the fuel tanks had been left off and kerosene spilled into the air intake. The pilot was able to abort the take off and the aircraft was repaired so it could continue flight testing. Nord took advantage of the opportunity to move the dive brakes to the rear fuselage, install servo controls, enlarge the vertical stabilizer and add a "lip" above the air intake to house a small radar. The work took almost a year and effectively ensured that the 2200 did not win the competition; a license-built version of the British de Havilland Sea Venom was ultimately selected to satisfy Aéronavale's requirement. The company received a contract during this time to evaluate replacing the Nene engine with a  Rolls-Royce RB.44 Tay engine, but this remained a study only.

The prototype did not fly again until 24 May 1951 and was flown intensively until 11 July when it was put into storage for most of the rest of the year. Intermittent flights resumed in December and the aircraft made its 100th flight on 25 February 1953. In June it began to be used to test rocket-assisted take offs using two rockets installed underneath the fuselage. The following month it demonstrated them at the Paris Air Show, but it only made occasional flights afterwards. The aircraft flew for the last time on 16 June 1954 and became a gunnery target at Bourges after its engine and most of its equipment was removed. That museum closed in 2014 and its collection was supposed to be distributed to other French museums, but no information about the current disposition of the prototype is available.

Specifications (as completed)

See also

References

Bibliography

External links
French-language site with an extensive gallery of the damaged aircraft

1940s French military aircraft
2200
Single-engined jet aircraft
Carrier-based aircraft
Cancelled military aircraft projects of France